is a private junior college in Munakata, Fukuoka, Japan. The college opened in 1990, and is affiliated with Tokai University.

External links
 

Private universities and colleges in Japan
Japanese junior colleges
Universities and colleges in Fukuoka Prefecture